Odites diakonoffi is a moth in the family Depressariidae. It was described by Vladimir Ivanovitsch Kuznetsov and N. V. Arutjunova in 1991. It is found in Kazakhstan.

References

Moths described in 1991
Odites